Hergiswil is a municipality in the canton of Nidwalden in Switzerland.

History
Hergiswil is first mentioned around 1303-09  as ze Hergenswile.

Geography

Of this area, 29.3% is used for agricultural purposes, while 44.4% is forested. Of the rest of the land, 9.7% is settled (buildings or roads) and the remainder (16.6%) is non-productive (rivers, glaciers or mountains).

The municipality is located between the foot of Mount Pilatus and Lake Lucerne.

Demographics
, 14.5% of the population was made up of foreign nationals. Over the last 10 years the population has grown at a rate of 11.5%. Most of the population speaks German  (91.0%), with Italian being second most common ( 2.0%) and French being third ( 1.1%).   the gender distribution of the population was 52.2% male and 47.8% female.

 there are 2,216 households, of which 1,627 households (or about 73.4%) contain only one or two individuals.  91 or about 4.1% are large households, with at least five members.

In the 2007 federal election the most popular party was the FDP which received 89.1% of the vote.  Most of the rest of the votes went to local small right-wing parties (9.3%).

In Hergiswil about 77.7% of the population (between age 25-64) have completed either non-mandatory upper secondary education or additional higher education (either university or a Fachhochschule).

Hergiswil has an unemployment rate of 1.24%.  , there were 89 people employed in the primary economic sector and about 35 businesses involved in this sector.  666 people are employed in the secondary sector and there are 72 businesses in this sector.  2,091 people are employed in the tertiary sector, with 382 businesses in this sector.

The historical population is given in the following table:

Transport
Hergiswil is served by Hergiswil station and Hergiswil Matt station on the Brünig railway line, and the linked Luzern–Stans–Engelberg line. The Lucerne S-Bahn services S4 and S5 combine to provide four trains per hour at each station. Hergiswil station is also served by hourly InterRegio trains between Lucerne and Interlaken, and between Lucerne and Engelberg.

Sights
The main sights of Hergiswil are: an old clergy house, the church, the chapel Maria zum guten Rat, old mansion Thumigerhaus, and a glazier's workshop with museum. The workshop was established in 1817, burning down on one occasion, but is still working.

References

External links
Official Homepage of Hergiswil
Official Homepage of the Glasi in Hergiswil
Glasi Ecuador site 

 
Municipalities of Nidwalden
Populated places on Lake Lucerne